Gilderoy is a bounded rural locality in Victoria, Australia, on the Yarra Junction Noojee Road to the west of Powelltown, located within the Shire of Yarra Ranges local government area. Gilderoy recorded a population of 62 at the 2021 census.

History

Gilderoy Post Office opened in 1902 and closed in 1976.

References

Towns in Victoria (Australia)
Yarra Valley
Yarra Ranges